The Rudy-Kodzoff House is a historic house at 2865 Mendenhall Loop Road in Juneau, Alaska.  It is a concrete structure with Craftsman/Bungalow styling, built in 1915 for Charles Rudy, one of the first settlers of the Mendenhall Valley.  It is the only surviving building of that period in the valley.  It presently houses the offices and owner's residence of a mobile home park developed by Kodzoff family.

The house was listed on the National Register of Historic Places in 2015.

See also
National Register of Historic Places listings in Juneau, Alaska

References

Houses on the National Register of Historic Places in Alaska
Houses completed in 1915
Houses in Juneau, Alaska
Buildings and structures on the National Register of Historic Places in Juneau, Alaska